In physics, Hooke's law is an empirical law which states that the force needed to extend or compress a spring by some distance scales linearly with respect to that distance—that is,  where  is a constant factor characteristic of the spring (i.e., its stiffness), and  is small compared to the total possible deformation of the spring. The law is named after 17th-century British physicist Robert Hooke. He first stated the law in 1676 as a Latin anagram. He published the solution of his anagram in 1678 as:  ("as the extension, so the force" or "the extension is proportional to the force"). Hooke states in the 1678 work that he was aware of the law since 1660.

Hooke's equation holds (to some extent) in many other situations where an elastic body is deformed, such as wind blowing on a tall building, and a musician plucking a string of a guitar. An elastic body or material for which this equation can be assumed is said to be linear-elastic or Hookean.

Hooke's law is only a first-order linear approximation to the real response of springs and other elastic bodies to applied forces. It must eventually fail once the forces exceed some limit, since no material can be compressed beyond a certain minimum size, or stretched beyond a maximum size, without some permanent deformation or change of state. Many materials will noticeably deviate from Hooke's law well before those elastic limits are reached.

On the other hand, Hooke's law is an accurate approximation for most solid bodies, as long as the forces and deformations are small enough. For this reason, Hooke's law is extensively used in all branches of science and engineering, and is the foundation of many disciplines such as seismology, molecular mechanics and acoustics. It is also the fundamental principle behind the spring scale, the manometer, the galvanometer, and the balance wheel of the mechanical clock.

The modern theory of elasticity generalizes Hooke's law to say that the strain (deformation) of an elastic object or material is proportional to the stress applied to it. However, since general stresses and strains may have multiple independent components, the "proportionality factor" may no longer be just a single real number, but rather a linear map (a tensor) that can be represented by a matrix of real numbers.

In this general form, Hooke's law makes it possible to deduce the relation between strain and stress for complex objects in terms of intrinsic properties of the materials they are made of. For example, one can deduce that a homogeneous rod with uniform cross section will behave like a simple spring when stretched, with a stiffness  directly proportional to its cross-section area and inversely proportional to its length.

Formal definition

For linear springs
Suppose that the spring has reached a state of equilibrium, where its length is not changing anymore. Let  be the amount by which the free end of the spring was displaced from its "relaxed" position (when it is not being stretched). Hooke's law states that  or, equivalently,  where  is a positive real number, characteristic of the spring.

Hooke's law for a spring is sometimes, but rarely, stated under the convention that  is the restoring force exerted by the spring on whatever is pulling its free end. In that case, the equation becomes  since the direction of the restoring force is opposite to that of the displacement.

General "scalar" springs
Hooke's spring law usually applies to any elastic object, of arbitrary complexity, as long as both the deformation and the stress can be expressed by a single number that can be both positive and negative.

For example, when a block of rubber attached to two parallel plates is deformed by shearing, rather than stretching or compression, the shearing force  and the sideways displacement of the plates  obey Hooke's law (for small enough deformations).

Hooke's law also applies when a straight steel bar or concrete beam (like the one used in buildings), supported at both ends, is bent by a weight  placed at some intermediate point. The displacement  in this case is the deviation of the beam, measured in the transversal direction, relative to its unloaded shape.

The law also applies when a stretched steel wire is twisted by pulling on a lever attached to one end. Or, equivalently, one can let  be the torque applied by the lever to the end of the wire, and  be the angle by which that end turns.

Vector formulation
In the case of a helical spring that is stretched or compressed along its axis, the applied (or restoring) force and the resulting elongation or compression have the same direction (which is the direction of said axis).

General tensor form
Some elastic bodies will deform in one direction when subjected to a force with a different direction. One example is a horizontal wood beam with non-square rectangular cross section that is bent by a transverse load that is neither vertical nor horizontal. In such cases, the magnitude of the displacement  will be proportional to the magnitude of the force , as long as the direction of the latter remains the same (and its value is not too large); so the scalar version of Hooke's law  will hold. However, the force and displacement vectors will not be scalar multiples of each other, since they have different directions. Moreover, the ratio  between their magnitudes will depend on the direction of the vector .

Yet, in such cases there is often a fixed linear relation between the force and deformation vectors, as long as they are small enough. Such a function is called a (second-order) tensor.

With respect to an arbitrary Cartesian coordinate system, the force and displacement vectors can be represented by 3 × 1 matrices of real numbers. Then the tensor  connecting them can be represented by a 3 × 3 matrix  of real coefficients, that, when multiplied by the displacement vector, gives the force vector:

Hooke's law for continuous media 

The stresses and strains of the material inside a continuous elastic material (such as a block of rubber, the wall of a boiler, or a steel bar) are connected by a linear relationship that is mathematically similar to Hooke's spring law, and is often referred to by that name.

However, the strain state in a solid medium around some point cannot be described by a single vector. The same parcel of material, no matter how small, can be compressed, stretched, and sheared at the same time, along different directions. Likewise, the stresses in that parcel can be at once pushing, pulling, and shearing.

In order to capture this complexity, the relevant state of the medium around a point must be represented by two-second-order tensors, the strain tensor  (in lieu of the displacement ) and the stress tensor  (replacing the restoring force ). The analogue of Hooke's spring law for continuous media is then  where  is a fourth-order tensor (that is, a linear map between second-order tensors) usually called the stiffness tensor or elasticity tensor. One may also write it as  where the tensor , called the compliance tensor, represents the inverse of said linear map.

In a Cartesian coordinate system, the stress and strain tensors can be represented by 3 × 3 matrices

Being a linear mapping between the nine numbers  and the nine numbers , the stiffness tensor  is represented by a matrix of  real numbers . Hooke's law then says that

where .

All three tensors generally vary from point to point inside the medium, and may vary with time as well. The strain tensor  merely specifies the displacement of the medium particles in the neighborhood of the point, while the stress tensor  specifies the forces that neighboring parcels of the medium are exerting on each other. Therefore, they are independent of the composition and physical state of the material. The stiffness tensor , on the other hand, is a property of the material, and often depends on physical state variables such as temperature, pressure, and microstructure.

This number can be further reduced by the symmetry of the material: 9 for an orthorhombic crystal, 5 for an hexagonal structure, and 3 for a cubic symmetry. For isotropic media (which have the same physical properties in any direction),  can be reduced to only two independent numbers, the bulk modulus  and the shear modulus , that quantify the material's resistance to changes in volume and to shearing deformations, respectively.

Analogous laws 
Since Hooke's law is a simple proportionality between two quantities, its formulas and consequences are mathematically similar to those of many other physical laws, such as those describing the motion of fluids, or the polarization of a dielectric by an electric field.

In particular, the tensor equation  relating elastic stresses to strains is entirely similar to the equation  relating the viscous stress tensor  and the strain rate tensor  in flows of viscous fluids; although the former pertains to static stresses (related to amount of deformation) while the latter pertains to dynamical stresses (related to the rate of deformation).

Units of measurement
In SI units, displacements are measured in meters (m), and forces in newtons (N or kg·m/s2). Therefore, the spring constant , and each element of the tensor , is measured in newtons per meter (N/m), or kilograms per second squared (kg/s2).

For continuous media, each element of the stress tensor  is a force divided by an area; it is therefore measured in units of pressure, namely pascals (Pa, or N/m2, or kg/(m·s2). The elements of the strain tensor  are dimensionless (displacements divided by distances).

General application to elastic materials 

Objects that quickly regain their original shape after being deformed by a force, with the molecules or atoms of their material returning to the initial state of stable equilibrium, often obey Hooke's law.

Hooke's law only holds for some materials under certain loading conditions. Steel exhibits linear-elastic behavior in most engineering applications; Hooke's law is valid for it throughout its elastic range (i.e., for stresses below the yield strength). For some other materials, such as aluminium, Hooke's law is only valid for a portion of the elastic range. For these materials a proportional limit stress is defined, below which the errors associated with the linear approximation are negligible.

Rubber is generally regarded as a "non-Hookean" material because its elasticity is stress dependent and sensitive to temperature and loading rate.

Generalizations of Hooke's law for the case of large deformations is provided by models of neo-Hookean solids and Mooney–Rivlin solids.

Derived formulae

Tensional stress of a uniform bar 

A rod of any elastic material may be viewed as a linear spring. The rod has length  and cross-sectional area . Its tensile stress  is linearly proportional to its fractional extension or strain  by the modulus of elasticity :

The modulus of elasticity may often be considered constant. In turn,

(that is, the fractional change in length), and since

it follows that:

The change in length may be expressed as

Spring energy 
That is, the integral of force over displacement. Since the external force has the same general direction as the displacement, the potential energy of a spring is always non-negative.

This potential  can be visualized as a parabola on the -plane such that . As the spring is stretched in the positive -direction, the potential energy increases parabolically (the same thing happens as the spring is compressed). Since the change in potential energy changes at a constant rate:

Relaxed force constants (generalized compliance constants) 
Relaxed force constants (the inverse of generalized compliance constants) are uniquely defined for molecular systems, in contradistinction to the usual "rigid" force constants, and thus their use allows meaningful correlations to be made between force fields calculated for reactants, transition states, and products of a chemical reaction. Just as the potential energy can be written as a quadratic form in the internal coordinates, so it can also be written in terms of generalized forces. The resulting coefficients are termed compliance constants. A direct method exists for calculating the compliance constant for any internal coordinate of a molecule, without the need to do the normal mode analysis. The suitability of relaxed force constants (inverse compliance constants) as covalent bond strength descriptors was demonstrated as early as 1980. Recently, the suitability as non-covalent bond strength descriptors was demonstrated too.

Harmonic oscillator 

A mass  attached to the end of a spring is a classic example of a harmonic oscillator. By pulling slightly on the mass and then releasing it, the system will be set in sinusoidal oscillating motion about the equilibrium position. To the extent that the spring obeys Hooke's law, and that one can neglect friction and the mass of the spring, the amplitude of the oscillation will remain constant; and its frequency  will be independent of its amplitude, determined only by the mass and the stiffness of the spring:

This phenomenon made possible the construction of accurate mechanical clocks and watches that could be carried on ships and people's pockets.

Rotation in gravity-free space 
If the mass  were attached to a spring with force constant  and rotating in free space, the spring tension would supply the required centripetal force:

Given that , this leads to the same frequency equation as above:

Linear elasticity theory for continuous media

Isotropic materials 

Isotropic materials are characterized by properties which are independent of direction in space. Physical equations involving isotropic materials must therefore be independent of the coordinate system chosen to represent them. The strain tensor is a symmetric tensor. Since the trace of any tensor is independent of any coordinate system, the most complete coordinate-free decomposition of a symmetric tensor is to represent it as the sum of a constant tensor and a traceless symmetric tensor. Thus in index notation:

where  is the Kronecker delta. In direct tensor notation:

where  is the second-order identity tensor.

The first term on the right is the constant tensor, also known as the volumetric strain tensor, and the second term is the traceless symmetric tensor, also known as the deviatoric strain tensor or shear tensor.

The most general form of Hooke's law for isotropic materials may now be written as a linear combination of these two tensors:

Using the relationships between the elastic moduli, these equations may also be expressed in various other ways. A common form of Hooke's law for isotropic materials, expressed in direct tensor notation, is

In index notation:

The inverse relationship is

Therefore, the compliance tensor in the relation  is

In terms of Young's modulus and Poisson's ratio, Hooke's law for isotropic materials can then be expressed as

This is the form in which the strain is expressed in terms of the stress tensor in engineering. The expression in expanded form is

(See 3-D elasticity).

In matrix form, Hooke's law for isotropic materials can be written as

where  is the engineering shear strain. The inverse relation may be written as

which can be simplified thanks to the Lamé constants:

In vector notation this becomes

where  is the identity tensor.

Plane stress 
Under plane stress conditions, . In that case Hooke's law takes the form

In vector notation this becomes

The inverse relation is usually written in the reduced form

Plane strain 
Under plane strain conditions, . In this case Hooke's law takes the form

Anisotropic materials 
The symmetry of the Cauchy stress tensor and the generalized Hooke's laws implies that . Similarly, the symmetry of the infinitesimal strain tensor implies that . These symmetries are called the minor symmetries of the stiffness tensor c. This reduces the number of elastic constants from 81 to 36.

If in addition, since the displacement gradient and the Cauchy stress are work conjugate, the stress–strain relation can be derived from a strain energy density functional, then

The arbitrariness of the order of differentiation implies that . These are called the major symmetries of the stiffness tensor. This reduces the number of elastic constants from 36 to 21. The major and minor symmetries indicate that the stiffness tensor has only 21 independent components.

Matrix representation (stiffness tensor) 
It is often useful to express the anisotropic form of Hooke's law in matrix notation, also called Voigt notation. To do this we take advantage of the symmetry of the stress and strain tensors and express them as six-dimensional vectors in an orthonormal coordinate system as

Then the stiffness tensor (c) can be expressed as

and Hooke's law is written as

Similarly the compliance tensor (s) can be written as

Change of coordinate system 
If a linear elastic material is rotated from a reference configuration to another, then the material is symmetric with respect to the rotation if the components of the stiffness tensor in the rotated configuration are related to the components in the reference configuration by the relation

where  are the components of an orthogonal rotation matrix . The same relation also holds for inversions.

In matrix notation, if the transformed basis (rotated or inverted) is related to the reference basis by

then

In addition, if the material is symmetric with respect to the transformation  then

Orthotropic materials 

Orthotropic materials have three orthogonal planes of symmetry. If the basis vectors are normals to the planes of symmetry then the coordinate transformation relations imply that

The inverse of this relation is commonly written as

where
 is the Young's modulus along axis 
 is the shear modulus in direction  on the plane whose normal is in direction 
 is the Poisson's ratio that corresponds to a contraction in direction  when an extension is applied in direction .

Under plane stress conditions, Hooke's law for an orthotropic material takes the form

The inverse relation is

The transposed form of the above stiffness matrix is also often used.

Transversely isotropic materials 
A transversely isotropic material is symmetric with respect to a rotation about an axis of symmetry. For such a material, if  is the axis of symmetry, Hooke's law can be expressed as

More frequently, the  axis is taken to be the axis of symmetry and the inverse Hooke's law is written as

Universal elastic anisotropy index 
To grasp the degree of anisotropy of any class, a universal elastic anisotropy index (AU) was formulated. It replaces the Zener ratio, which is suited for cubic crystals.

Thermodynamic basis 

Linear deformations of elastic materials can be approximated as adiabatic. Under these conditions and for quasistatic processes the first law of thermodynamics for a deformed body can be expressed as

The work can be split into two terms

where  is the work done by surface forces while  is the work done by body forces. If  is a variation of the displacement field  in the body, then the two external work terms can be expressed as

where  is the surface traction vector,  is the body force vector,  represents the body and  represents its surface. Using the relation between the Cauchy stress and the surface traction,  (where  is the unit outward normal to ), we have

Converting the surface integral into a volume integral via the divergence theorem gives

Using the symmetry of the Cauchy stress and the identity

we have the following

From the definition of strain and from the equations of equilibrium we have

Hence we can write

and therefore the variation in the internal energy density is given by

An elastic material is defined as one in which the total internal energy is equal to the potential energy of the internal forces (also called the elastic strain energy). Therefore, the internal energy density is a function of the strains,  and the variation of the internal energy can be expressed as

Since the variation of strain is arbitrary, the stress–strain relation of an elastic material is given by

where c is a fourth-rank tensor of material constants, also called the stiffness tensor. We can see why c must be a fourth-rank tensor by noting that, for a linear elastic material,

In index notation

The right-hand side constant requires four indices and is a fourth-rank quantity. We can also see that this quantity must be a tensor because it is a linear transformation that takes the strain tensor to the stress tensor. We can also show that the constant obeys the tensor transformation rules for fourth-rank tensors.

See also 

 Acoustoelastic effect
 Elastic potential energy
 Laws of science
 List of scientific laws named after people
 Quadratic form
 Series and parallel springs
 Spring system
 Simple harmonic motion of a mass on a spring
 Sine wave
 Solid mechanics
 Spring pendulum

Notes

References 

Hooke’s law - The Feynman Lectures on Physics
Hooke's Law - Classical Mechanics - Physics - MIT OpenCourseWare

External links 
 JavaScript Applet demonstrating Springs and Hooke's law
 JavaScript Applet demonstrating Spring Force

1676 in science
Springs (mechanical)
Elasticity (physics)
Solid mechanics
Structural analysis